Amalberga of Temse (c. 741 – 10 July 772) was a Lotharingian noblewoman from the Frankish royal house of the Pippinids who is celebrated as a saint in the Roman Catholic Church and the Eastern Orthodox Church. She is especially venerated in Temse, Ghent, Munsterbilzen and other parts of Flanders.  She received the veil from Saint Willibrord of Echternach.

Cult 
Many miracles, such as crossing the river Scheldt on a giant fish are attributed to her. In heraldry and art this is a sturgeon. Her relics are kept inside the church of Temse.

Her vita is connected to Charlemagne, whom her biographer (Goscelin of St. Bertin) said wanted to marry her, although other sources claim that the Charles in question was Charles Martel. When she refused in order to continue her vocation as a virgin, he tried to move her by force; he broke her arm, but was unable to carry her off. He fell ill because of his actions, but she forgave him and prayed to God to heal him.

Feast July 10 or October 27.

References 

740s births
772 deaths
8th-century Frankish saints
Pippinids
Belgian Roman Catholic saints
8th-century Frankish women
Christian female saints of the Middle Ages
People from Bilzen
People from Temse